David Helliwell (28 March 1948 – 22 March 2003) was an English professional footballer who made 257 appearances with 25 goals scored in the Football League, playing as a winger for Blackburn Rovers, Lincoln City, Workington and Rochdale. He also played non-league football for Morecambe.

Helliwell was born in 1948 in Blackburn, Lancashire, and died there in 2003 at the age of 54.

Career 
In 1969, at the age of 21, he was signed for Lincoln City by manager Ron Gray for a fee of £4,000. In the previous season, when Jim Smith moved to Boston United as player-manager, Helliwell got an other new signing midfield partner Billy Taylor from Nottingham Forest.

In the first game of the 1969/70 season against Colchester United at Sincil Bank, Helliwell made his City debut alongside Taylor.

During the summer of 1970, Helliwell was released on a free transfer joining Workington, played around 200 games for the Cumbrian side, scoring 21 goals, and was featured against City over the next five seasons. After getting a free transfer prior to Workington’s last season in the League, he then spent a year with Rochdale before joining Morecambe side for Northern Premier League in 1977.

References

External links
 Retrospective at Lincoln City fansite The Stacey West

1948 births
2003 deaths
Footballers from Blackburn
English footballers
Association football wingers
Blackburn Rovers F.C. players
Lincoln City F.C. players
Workington A.F.C. players
Rochdale A.F.C. players
Morecambe F.C. players
English Football League players